Mikhail Semyonovich Chudov (Russian: Михаил Семёнович Чудов; September 17, 1893 – October 30, 1937) was a Russian  revolutionary and Soviet politician. He and his wife were shot during the Great Purge.

Early years
Mikhail Semenovich Chudov was born on September 17, 1893 in the village of Khoneevo, Bezhetsky District, Tver Governorate. He worked as a printer in Saint Petersburg. He joined the Bolshevik faction of the Russian Social Democratic Labour Party ("RSDLP(b)") in 1913.

Career as a Communist official
Chudov participated in the February and October revolutions of 1917. In 1918-1920 he was the chairman of the Bezhetsk party committee and the district executive committee. He later became Chairman of the Tver Provincial Executive Committee, Secretary of the Provincial Committee of the RCP(b), Secretary of the District Committee in Rostov-on-Don, and a member of the North Caucasian Regional Committee of the All-Union Communist Party (Bolsheviks) ("CPSU(b)").

In 1928-1936 he was the 2nd Secretary of the Leningrad Regional Party Committee, a deputy to Sergei Kirov, the 1st Secretary. He was a delegate to the 11th-17th Congresses of the CPSU(b), a candidate member of the Central Committee of the RCP(b) (1923-1925), a member of the Central Committee of the CPSU(b) (1925-1937), and a member of the All-Russian Central Executive Committee, the Central Executive Committee of the USSR.

He was removed from office, arrested and executed during the Great Purge. His wife, L. K. Shaposhnikova, was also repressed and shot.

On March 17, 1956 during the Khrushchev thaw, Mikhail Chudov was posthumously rehabilitated.

References

 Anatoly Rybakov: Jahre des Terrors. Roman. Deutsch von Juri Elperin. 440 Seiten. Deutscher Taschenbuch Verlag (dtv 11590), München 1992,

External links

 Foto
 Michail Semjonowitsch Tschudow in the Encyclopedia der Tver Oblast (Russian)
 Michail Semjonowitsch Tschudow im Sacharow-Zentrum (Russian)

 Biography
 Michail Semjonowitsch Tschudow im Handbook of the history of the Communist Party of the Soviet Union 1898–1991 (Russian)
 Michail Semjonowitsch Tschudow in the Great Biographical Encyclopedia (Russian)
 Michail Semjonowitsch Tschudow auf Tverskoi Krai (Russian)
 Eintrag bei knowbysight.info (Russian)
 Michail Semjonowitsch Tschudow in the Great Soviet Encyclopedia (Russian)

1893 births
1937 deaths
Great Purge victims from Russia
People executed by the Soviet Union
All-Russian Central Executive Committee members
Central Committee of the Communist Party of the Soviet Union members
Central Executive Committee of the Soviet Union members
People from Tver Oblast